The 1912 State of the Union Address was given on Tuesday, December 3, 1912. It was written by William H. Taft, the 27th president of the United States. He stated, "The position of the United States in the moral, intellectual, and material relations of the family of nations should be a matter of vital interest to every patriotic citizen."  He said, "Our small Army now consists of 83,809 men, excluding the 5,000 Philippine scouts. Leaving out of consideration the Coast Artillery force, whose position is fixed in our various seacoast defenses, and the present garrisons of our various insular possessions, we have to-day within the continental United States a mobile Army of only about 35,000 men. This little force must be still further drawn upon to supply the new garrisons for the great naval base which is being established at Pearl Harbor, in the Hawaiian Islands, and to protect the locks now rapidly approaching completion at Panama."

References

Presidency of William Howard Taft
State of the Union addresses
62nd United States Congress
State of the Union Address
State of the Union Address
State of the Union Address
State of the Union Address
December 1912 events in the United States
State of the Union